Omar Gurí Martínez (born January 1, 1966, in Rosario del Tala, Entre Ríos Province) is an Argentine racing driver. He competed in Turismo Carretera, TC2000, Top Race V6 and others. His nickname Gurí is a common Guaraní term used in his hometown to refer to a young boy.

Career
Martínez started his career in domestical Formula Entrerriana in 1983, being vice-champion in 1985. Then he passed to Argentine Formula Renault. He clinched back-to-back both 1990 and 1991 Championships before joining the competitive Formula Three Sudamericana, where he was runner-up in 1994.
 
Back to Argentine series, he started racing in Turismo Carretera and TC2000 in 1995, representing Ford in both championships.

In 1997, he crowned himself as Top Race champion by winning to Juan María Traverso in the final race. Traverso and himself were team-mates in 1998 TC 2000 season driving Hondas, and Martínez got his first title in that series.

Nevertheless, Gurí could not become Turismo Carretera champion until 2004, being four times vice-champion from 1999 to 2002. He has held since racing duels with drivers as Guillermo Ortelli and Traverso. He won the Konex Award Merit Diploma in 2010 as one of the five best Racing Drivers of the last decade in Argentina. He became TC champion again in 2015. Since 2018 he has been semi-retired.

Career 
 1983–1986: Formula Entrerriana
 1987–1992: Argentine Formula Renault (1990 and 1991 Champion)
 1992–1994: Formula Three Sudamericana
 1995: TC (Ford Falcon), TC2000 (Ford Escort XR3)
 1996: TC (Ford Falcon), TC2000 (Renault 19)
 1997: TC (Ford Falcon), Top Race Champion (Honda Prelude), TC2000 (Honda Civic VI)
 1998: TC (Ford Falcon), Top Race (Honda Prelude), TC2000 Champion (Honda Civic VI)
 1999: TC (Ford Falcon), Top Race (Honda Prelude), TC2000 (Honda Civic VI)
 2000: TC (Ford Falcon), Top Race Champion (Honda Prelude and BMW 320), TC2000 (Honda Civic VI)
 2001: TC (Ford Falcon), Top Race (Honda Civic VI), TC2000 (Honda Civic VI)
 2002: TC (Ford Falcon), TC2000 (Honda Civic VI and Toyota Corolla)
 2003: TC (Ford Falcon), Top Race (Peugeot 406), TC2000 (Toyota Corolla)
 2004: TC Champion (Ford Falcon), Top Race (Ford Focus I)
 2005: TC (Ford Falcon), TRV6 (Ford Mondeo MK III)
 2006: TC (Ford Falcon), TRV6 Champion (Ford Mondeo MK III)
 2007: TC (Ford Falcon), TRV6 (Ford Mondeo MK III)
 2008: TC (Ford Falcon), TRV6 (Ford Mondeo MK III)
 2009: TC (Ford Falcon), TRV6 (Ford Mondeo MK III), TC2000  (Fiat Linea)
 2010: TC (Ford Falcon), TRV6 (Ford Mondeo MK III)
 2011: TC (Ford Falcon), TRV6 (Ford Mondeo MK IV)
 2012: TC (Ford Falcon), TRV6 (Ford Mondeo MK IV and Mercedes-Benz C-Class W204)
 2013: TC (Ford Falcon)
 2014: TC (Ford Falcon)
 2015: TC Champion (Ford Falcon)
 2016: TC (Ford Falcon), Turismo Nacional Clase 3 (Ford Focus II and Ford Focus III)
 2017: TC (Ford Falcon)
 2018: TC Pick Up (Ford Ranger)
 2019: TC Pick Up (Ford Ranger)
 2020: TC Pick Up (Ford Ranger)
 2021: TC Pick Up (Ford Ranger)
 2022: TC Pick Up Champion (Ford Ranger)

External links 
  Official site
 

TC 2000 Championship drivers
Turismo Carretera drivers
1966 births
Sportspeople from Entre Ríos Province
Argentine racing drivers
Argentine people of Spanish descent
Living people
Top Race V6 drivers
Formula Renault Argentina drivers
Formula 3 Sudamericana drivers